Rebecca Holden is an American actress and singer.

Career

While continuing voice studies in New York City, Holden became a model best known as "the Breck Girl". She went on to model on magazine covers and to film national commercials such as for Ivory Soap, Dentyne, Kellogg's, Chevrolet, Gillette, Playtex, Arrid, and 7 Up.

Holden guest-starred on primetime shows such as The Love Boat, Magnum, P.I., Matt Houston, Three's Company, Taxi, Night Court, Mike Hammer, Remington Steele, Barney Miller, Quincy, T.J. Hooker, Police Squad! and others.
She then joined the cast of the TV series Knight Rider in the series regular role of  April Curtis during the show's second season (1983–1984). Knight Rider has appeared in syndication in over 200 countries throughout the world, most notably in Australia, Canada, Germany, and the United Kingdom.

She played the diabolical Elena on ABC's soap opera General Hospital, and later moved to Tennessee to help  care for her ill sister. During this period she appeared in many stage plays and musicals such as the role of Nancy in Oliver! and Lola in Damn Yankees.  Holden starred in a production of Baby, the Musical at the Boiler Room Theatre in Franklin, Tennessee

In 2015, Holden starred in the feature Hollywouldn'ts, and also had a lead role in a pilot for Comedy Central.

She was co-host of the TNN dance show Dancin' at the Hot Spots in 1993. She continues to tour internationally with her music, and serves as an emcee and performer for various charitable and corporate events as well as for military and veterans affairs.

In 2009, Holden portrayed the character Beth in the movie adaptation of The Book of Ruth: Journey of Faith.

On May 15, 2017, filmmaker Richard Rossi announced Holden had been cast in the lead role of Sister Sara Sunday in the independent film Canaan Land.

Music
While she was still a model, Holden formed a country music group and toured with it for two years.

Classically trained as a voice major and piano minor in college, Holden has sung opera and performed the lead roles in such musicals as Oliver! and Damn Yankees. She recorded a country album for Curb records, and her music videos have appeared on TNN and CMT.  She recorded both a country and gospel album for BMG Records in Switzerland, and toured in Europe and Asia, including performing for the King of Malaysia. She was the featured performer with the United States Air Force Band at a memorial for World War II veterans. During Holden's service as president of the Music City Christian Fellowship, she performed as singer and mistress of ceremonies for the Christian Country Music Awards and the Sunday gospel shows at the Grand Ole Opry.

Holden charted two singles for TRA-Star Records in 1989: "The Truth Doesn't Always Rhyme" and "License to Steal". She recorded the album The Highway Runs Both Ways for Curb Records and a self-titled album for BMG Europe.

In the early 2010s, Holden and Kevin Sasaki toured in "Together Forever", a musical tribute to Eydie Gormé and Steve Lawrence.

Holden's most recent CD single release is "Dreams Come True", a duet with Tony LeBron, on Silver Blue/Summit Records.

Personal life
Holden married Bobby Vassallo, her childhood sweetheart.

Public service
Holden has been active with the relief organizations Operation California, with charity work in Ethiopia, and Operation Texas, providing help to earthquake victims in Mexico City.

Recognition
In 1989, Holden was recognized as both New Independent Artist and New Independent Female at the first Cash Box magazine Nashville Music Awards.

Filmography

Discography

References

External links

Official website

American musical theatre actresses
American women country singers
American country singer-songwriters
American film actresses
American soap opera actresses
Living people
20th-century American actresses
21st-century American actresses
20th-century American singers
21st-century American singers
20th-century American women singers
21st-century American women singers
American television actresses
Actresses from Dallas
Singer-songwriters from Texas
Country musicians from Texas
American women singer-songwriters
Year of birth missing (living people)